David IV of Georgia was King of Georgia in the 11th and 12th centuries.

David IV also refers to:

David IV, Catholicos-Patriarch of Georgia
the Caucasian Albanian Catholicos, see List of Caucasian Albanian catholicoi